Sertularella is a genus of hydroids in the family Sertulariidae.

Species
The following species are classed in this genus:
Sertularella acutidentata Billard, 1919
Sertularella africana Stechow, 1919
Sertularella agulhenis Millard, 1964
Sertularella albida Kirchenpauer, 1884
Sertularella allmani Hartlaub, 1901
Sertularella ampullacea Fraser, 1938
Sertularella anguina Vervoort, 1993
Sertularella annulata (Allman, 1888)
Sertularella antarctica Hartlaub, 1901
Sertularella arbuscula (Lamouroux, 1816)
Sertularella areyi Nutting, 1904
Sertularella asymmetra Galea & Schories, 2014
Sertularella avrilia Watson, 1973
Sertularella billardi Vervoort, 1993
Sertularella bipectinata Vervoort, 1993
Sertularella blanconae El Beshbeeshy, 2011
Sertularella brandti Linko, 1912
Sertularella calderi Galea, 2013
Sertularella capensis Millard, 1957
Sertularella catena (Allman, 1888)
Sertularella cervicula Choong, 2015
Sertularella clarkii Mereschkowsky, 1878
Sertularella clausa (Allman, 1888)
Sertularella complexa Nutting, 1904
Sertularella conella Stechow, 1920
Sertularella congregata Millard, 1964
Sertularella conica Allman, 1877
Sertularella contorta Kirchenpauer, 1884
Sertularella coronata Choong, 2015
Sertularella costata Leloup, 1940
Sertularella crassa Billard, 1919
Sertularella crassicaulis (Heller, 1868)
Sertularella crassiuscula Bale, 1924
Sertularella craticula Naumov, 1960
Sertularella crenulata Nutting, 1905
Sertularella cruzensis El Beshbeeshy, 2011
Sertularella cubica García Aguirre & Gonzalez, 1980
Sertularella curta Galea & Schories, 2014
Sertularella curvitheca Galea & Schories, 2012
Sertularella decipiens Billard, 1919
Sertularella diaphana (Allman, 1885)
Sertularella dubia Billard, 1907
Sertularella ellisii (Deshayes & Milne Edwards, 1836)
Sertularella erratum Vervoort & Watson, 2003
Sertularella exigua Thompson, 1879
Sertularella exilis Fraser, 1938
Sertularella flabellum (Allman, 1885)
Sertularella folliformis Galea, 2016
Sertularella fraseri Galea, 2010
Sertularella fuegonensis El Beshbeeshy, 2011
Sertularella fusiformis (Hincks, 1861)
Sertularella fusoides Stechow, 1926
Sertularella gaudichaudi (Lamouroux, 1824)
Sertularella gayi (Lamouroux, 1821)
Sertularella geodiae Totton, 1930
Sertularella gigantea Hincks, 1874
Sertularella gilchristi Millard, 1964
Sertularella goliathus Stechow, 1923
Sertularella helenae Vervoort, 1993
Sertularella hermanosensis El Beshbeeshy, 2012
Sertularella humilis Fraser, 1943
Sertularella implexa (Allman, 1888)
Sertularella inabai Stechow, 1913
Sertularella incisa Fraser, 1938
Sertularella inconstans Billard, 1919
Sertularella integra Allman, 1876
Sertularella japonica Stechow, 1926
Sertularella juanfernandezensis Galea et al., 2017
Sertularella keiensis Billard, 1925
Sertularella kerguelensis Allman, 1876
Sertularella lagenoides Stechow, 1919
Sertularella leiocarpa (Allman, 1888)
Sertularella leiocarpoides Vervoort, 1993
Sertularella levigata Stechow, 1931
Sertularella magna Nutting, 1904
Sertularella maureenae Choong, Calder & Brinckmann-Voss, 2012
Sertularella mediterranea Hartlaub, 1901
Sertularella megastoma Nutting, 1904
Sertularella megista Stechow, 1923
Sertularella microtheca Leloup, 1974
Sertularella mirabilis Jäderholm, 1896
Sertularella miurensis Stechow, 1921
Sertularella mixta Galea & Schories, 2012
Sertularella mutsuensis Stechow, 1931
Sertularella mytila Watson, 2011
Sertularella natalensis Millard, 1968
Sertularella novaecaledoniae Vervoort, 1993
Sertularella novarae Marktanner-Turneretscher, 1890
Sertularella nuttingi Billard, 1914
Sertularella oblonga Galea, Häussermann & Försterra, 2017
Sertularella obtusa Stechow, 1931
Sertularella ornata Broch, 1933
Sertularella pacifica Choong, 2015
Sertularella patagonica (D'Orbigny, 1846)
Sertularella paucicostata Vervoort, 1993
Sertularella pauciramosa Galea & Schories, 2014
Sertularella peculiaris (Leloup, 1935)
Sertularella pinnata (Lamouroux, 1816)
Sertularella plicata Galea, 2016
Sertularella polyzonias (Linnaeus, 1758)
Sertularella producta (Allman, 1888)
Sertularella pseudocatena Galea, 2016
Sertularella pseudocostata Vervoort, 1993
Sertularella pulchra Stechow, 1923
Sertularella quadrata Nutting, 1895
Sertularella quadridens (Bale, 1884)
Sertularella quadrifida Hartlaub, 1901
Sertularella quinquelaminata Stechow, 1931
Sertularella recta Galea & Schories, 2017
Sertularella robusta Coughtrey, 1876
Sertularella robustissima Galea, Häussermann & Försterra, 2017
Sertularella robustoides Mulder & Trebilcock, 1915
Sertularella rugosa (Linnaeus, 1758)
Sertularella sacciformis Choong, 2015
Sertularella sagamina Stechow, 1921
Sertularella sanmatiasensis El Beshbeeshy, 2011
Sertularella simplex (Hutton, 1873)
Sertularella sinensis Jäderholm, 1896
Sertularella spinosa Kirchenpauer, 1884
Sertularella spirifera Stechow, 1931
Sertularella splendida Galea, 2016
Sertularella stolonifera Vervoort & Watson, 2003
Sertularella subantarctica Galea, 2017
Sertularella tanneri Nutting, 1904
Sertularella tasmanica Bale, 1915
Sertularella tenella (Alder, 1857)
Sertularella tilesii Kirchenpauer, 1884
Sertularella tricincta Billard, 1939
Sertularella tronconica Galea, 2016
Sertularella tubulosa Galea, 2016
Sertularella undulitheca Vervoort, 1959
Sertularella unituba Calder, 1991
Sertularella valdiviae Stechow, 1923
Sertularella vervoorti El Beshbeeshy, 2011
Sertularella wallacei Stechow, 1926
Sertularella whitei Rees & Vervoort, 1987
Sertularella xantha Stechow, 1923
Sertularella zenkevitchi Naumov, 1960

References

Sertularellidae
Cnidarian genera